is a publishing group of Japanese Dōjinshi. The group is famous in Japan as scientific and Otaku activities. It is established in 1990s and its address is in Kashiwa city.
The book is introduced by Japanese TV programs in many times.  which is their monthly magazine, won the prize of "Best titled book in Japan (日本タイトルだけ大賞)" in 2012. Many of members write their books in handle name.

History
 1993: They started by Kana Hoshino.
 1996: They started to join the Comiket.
 1999: Their works are introduced in ""ミニコミ魂"" by Tsutomu Kushima.
 2012: Talking event produced by Junkudo book store in Ikebukuro town.
 2014: Getting difficultly(入手困難) won the Strange book award(ヘンな本大賞) in Japan.
 2015: Rocket news (English version) wrote about them.
 2016: Rocket news (Japanese version) wrote about them.

Books
More than 200 titles are published. Their books are able to classify of three types; number lists, avant-garde books and scientific descriptions.

Number lists
One million digits of the circular constant (円周率1000000桁表, 1996)
One hundred million digits of the circular constant (円周率一億桁表, 2016)
One hundred million digits of the circular constant small edition  (円周率100,000,000桁表, 2019) (It is printed with micro characters similar to the banknote anti-counterfeiting technology.)
Prime numbers 150000 (素数表150000, 2011)
All the O157, Escherichia coli (大腸菌O157のすべて)
Omega constant, one million digits (オメガ定数100万桁表)
One million digits of the 
One million digits of the Euler's constant (オイラー定数1000000桁表)
"'Monthly Pi (月刊円周率) 
"Monthli Zeta" (月刊ゼータ関数のゼロ点) 

Many types of mathematical constants are provided online.

Avant-garde booksA cut book (切られた本)Just a covered (カバーしかない本)Just a book band(オビしかない本)Only in NDL(国会図書館にしかない本)New Testament for Online Game Enthusiasts: Gospel of Mark (ネトゲ廃人のための新約聖書)

Scientific descriptionsQuantum mechanics on 32 pages (32ページの量子力学入門, 2010)Unexpected Science Magazine 2015 (サイエンスアゴラ2015とっぱつ合同誌！)Learning for Pattern Recognition and Machine Learning (パターン認識と機械学習の学習)

OthersMy use of money charges is wrong as I expected (やはり俺のソシャゲ課金は間違っているだろうか)

Members
 Kana Hoshino acts for the group. 
 Shinkiroh Shiroma was a writer in past.
 Shi is a main writer in the group. 
 Takaki Makino wrote the 円周率1000000桁表 in 1996.
 Shigeo Mitsunari wrote パターン認識と機械学習の学習 which gave explanations of Pattern Recognition and Machine Learning by prof. Bishop.
Over ten other members write books and sell their books in the Comiket.

Performances
 They sell their books using a weight indicator in the Comiket.
 They discount their books by amount of Pi memorized in the Comiket.
 Coupon ticket is often issued in the Comiket.
 Shi'' cantillated the Pi in the Comiket Special 4.

References

 Comiket catalog: (Japanese)
 The best tinsyo:  (Japanese)
 Henna hon taizen:  (Japanese)
 The British Library

External links
 
 
 Comiket Special 4 events (2005)
 
 

Doujin
Dōjinshi
Mathematics organizations